Charles Todd is a pen name used by the American authors Caroline Todd and Charles Todd, who were mother and son. Caroline Todd was the pen name for Carolyn Watjen and Charles Todd is the pen name for her son David Watjen. Caroline Todd died on August 28, 2021, at age 86 from complications of a lung infection. Charles Todd lives in North Carolina.

The authors are best known for a series of novels, set in post World War I England.  The books deal with the cases of Inspector Ian Rutledge, a veteran of the European campaigns who is attempting to pick up the pieces of his Scotland Yard career. However, he must keep his greatest burden a secret: suffering from shell shock, he lives with the constant, cynical, taunting voice of Hamish MacLeod, a young Scots soldier he was forced to execute on the battlefield for refusing an order and moments before a shell from their own artillery buried Rutledge's regiment alive. Only Rutledge survived because of a small air pocket between his face and Hamish MacLeod's body. 

They are also the authors of a series about Bess Crawford, a nurse serving in France during World War I.

Recognition 
A Test of Wills (1996) – was nominated for the John Creasey Award in the United Kingdom; other nominations are the Edgar Award, an Anthony, and the Independent Mystery Booksellers Association Dilys Award. The work won the Barry Award from the Deadly Pleasures Mystery Magazine. The Independent Mystery Booksellers Association named A Test of Wills one of the 100 favorite mysteries of the 20th Century, and it received a starred review in Publishers Weekly and was a New York Times Notable Book of the Year.
Wings of Fire (1998) – received a nomination for the Independent Mystery Booksellers Association Dilys Award and was shortlisted for first Ellis Peters Mystery Award in the United Kingdom
Legacy of the Dead (2000) – received an Anthony Award nomination.
An Unmarked Grave (2012) – received an Agatha Award nomination for Best Historical Novel.
A Question of Honor (2013) – won the Agatha Award for Best Historical Novel.

Publications
Featuring Inspector Ian Rutledge

A Test of Wills (1996) 	. 
Wings of Fire (1998) 	. 
Search the Dark (1999) 	. 
Legacy of the Dead (2000) 	. 
Watchers of Time (2001) 	. 
A Fearsome Doubt (2002) 	. 
A Cold Treachery (2005) 	. 
A Long Shadow (2006) 	. 
A False Mirror (2007) 	. 
A Pale Horse (2008) 	. 
A Matter of Justice (2009) . 
The Red Door (2010)        . 
A Lonely Death (2011)      . 
The Confession (2012)      . 
Proof of Guilt (2013)	. 
Hunting Shadows (2014)     . 
A Fine Summer's Day (2015) . 
No Shred of Evidence (2016) . 
Racing the Devil (2017)	. 
The Piper (2017)	. 
The Gate Keeper (2018)	. 
The Black Ascot (2019)	. 
A Divided Loyalty (2020)	. 
A Fatal Lie (2021)	. 
A Game of Fear (2022)	. 

Featuring Bess Crawford
A Duty to the Dead (2009)       . 
An Impartial Witness (2010)     . 
A Bitter Truth (2011)           . 
An Unmarked Grave (2012)        . 
A Question of Honor (2013)      . 
An Unwilling Accomplice (2014)  . 
A Pattern of Lies (2015)        . 
The Shattered Tree (2016)       . 
A Casualty of War (2017)        . 
A Forgotten Place (2018)        . 
A Cruel Deception (2019)        . 
A Hanging at Dawn (2020)        . 
An Irish Hostage (2021)         . 
The Cliff's Edge (2023)

Stand-alone Novels
The Murder Stone (2003)         . 
The Walnut Tree (2012)          .

References

External links
 Charles Todd official webpage

20th-century American novelists
21st-century American novelists
Agatha Award winners
Women mystery writers
Barry Award winners
Writing duos
20th-century American women writers
21st-century American women writers
Novelists from Delaware
Novelists from North Carolina